Moinul Hoque Choudhury (13 May 1923 – 13 February 1976) was an Indian politician from Assam. A five-time MLA; he was the Minister of Commerce and Industrial Development during Indira Gandhi regime in 1971. He is also known as the Industrial Reformer of the Barak Valley.

Biography 
Moinul Choudhury was born on 13 May 1923 in a well-off Bengali Muslim family of Sonabarighat in Cachar district of Assam. He was born to mother Mona Bibi and father Montajir Ali. His father Montazir Ali was educated, and was always concerned about getting his son well educated. Choudhury took his primary education from ME School of Sonabraighat. He passed Matriculation from Silchar Government HS School and later joined Cotton College, Guwahati/Murari Chand College of Sylhet and passed +2 in 1942.

He graduated with History Honors from Presidency College of Calcutta in 1944. In the Presidency, he defeated Sheikh Mujibur Rahman in the college election. He pursued MA in History securing first class first position from Aligarh Muslim University in 1946. This was when he joined Muslim League and took part in the Indian independence movement. He was also the general secretary of youth front of Muslim League on the national level. In 1947, he obtained LLB from Aligarh Muslim University. In a meeting with Mohammed Ali Jinnah, Moinul Hoque Choudhury represented Barak Valley. Inspired by the ideals of Netaji Subhas Chandra Bose and Moulana Abul Kalam Azad, Hoque joined the freedom struggle. Following India's independence and the partition of India, he joined Indian National Congress under the influence of Fakaruddin Ali Ahmed.

To start off his career, Moinul Hoque Choudhury joined the Bar Association of Silchar in 1948 and later in 1950, he joined active politics as a member of local board in 1950 and was a nominated member of Silchar Municipality in the same year. He became a member of Assam Legislative Assembly in 1952 from East Sonai constituency.  Moninul Hoque became a cabinet minister (agriculture) in 1957 after being elected for the second time from the same constituency. On being elected for the third term in 1962, he became the leader of the Congress legislature in the assembly in addition to being a cabinet minister. In 1967. He was elected for the fourth time as MLA from Sonai Constituency, but was abstained from ministerial portfolio following a feud with Bimala Prasad Chaliha. He was selected as chairman of national Haj Committee in the same year.  He entered the national politics in 1971 by returning to the parliament from Dhubri and was offered the ministry of industry under the Government of India.

Work 

The improvement of road and communication system, construction of embankments in Cachar to facilitate agriculture, establishment of All India Radio, Silchar Medical College, Veterinary school, Hindustan Paper Mill at Panchgram, Sugar Mill at Anipur, the Regional Engineering College now upgraded as NIT are his achievements. He was the first person in Cachar to forward the proposal for the construction of Barak Dam. He will be remembered in the valley for the noble attempt he made to usher in a green revolution in the valley through the package program in the sixties when advanced technology, high yielding seeds, scientific manure, pesticides were introduced for the first time in Cachar, and many more.

Timeline 

 13 May 1923: Born in Sonabarighat of Sonai, Silchar
 1940: Passed Matriculation from Silchar Government HS School
 1942: Passed +2 from Cotton College, Gauhati
 1944: Completed graduation in History Honours from Presidency College, Kolkata
 1946: Pursued MA in history from Aligarh Muslim University, joined Muslim League, took part in the freedom struggle of India.
 1947: Obtained LLB from Aligarh Muslim University
 1948:  Joined Bar Association of Silchar
 1950: Elected as member of local board
 1951: Joined Indian National Congress
 1952: Elected as MLA from Sonai Constituency, and member of Public Accounts Committee and Text Book
 1957: Elected for the second time MLA from Sonai Constituency, won a ministerial portfolio, agriculture
 1961: Attended UNO General Convention as one of the delegates from India
 1962: Elected for the second time as a minister from Sonai constituency
 1967: Elected for the fourth time as MLA from Sonai Constituency, but unfortunately was abstained from ministerial portfolio * following a feud with Bimala Prasad Chaliha, selected as chairman of national Haj Committee.
 1968: Went on a pilgrimage to holy Mecca and Madina
 1971: Elected as MP from Dhubri constituency in a by-election and won ministerial portfolio of Industrial Development
 1976: Died in AIIMS, Delhi on 13 February aged 52.

References 

Fifth Lok Sabha Members Bioprofile
Unishe May: Moinul Haque Choudhury (1923-1976)
Moinul Hoque Choudhury Memorial Science College
Unsung Hero of Assam: Mastufa's Blogs

People from Cachar district
1923 births
1976 deaths
Assam politicians
Faculty of Law, Aligarh Muslim University alumni
Indian National Congress politicians from Assam
Assam MLAs 1952–1957
Assam MLAs 1957–1962
Assam MLAs 1962–1967
Assam MLAs 1967–1972
State cabinet ministers of Assam
All India Muslim League members
Commerce and Industry Ministers of India
Cotton College, Guwahati alumni
20th-century Bengalis
Murari Chand College alumni